The 2014–15 Texas–Arlington Mavericks women's basketball team represented the University of Texas at Arlington during the 2014–15 NCAA Division I women's basketball season. The Mavericks, led by second year head coach Krista Gerlich, played their home games at the College Park Center and were second year members of the Sun Belt Conference.

The Mavericks were the fifth seed in the 2015 Sun Belt Conference tournament where they lost to the Texas State Bobcats 46–52. The team's overall record was 17–13 with a conference record of 11–9. With the 17 win overall record, the Mavericks recorded a 13 win increase over the previous season, the largest season-on-season increase in program history.

Roster

Schedule

|-
!colspan=9 style="background:#F58024; color:#FFFFFF;"| Out of Conference Games

|-
!colspan=9 style="background:#0064b1; color:#FFFFFF;"| Sun Belt Conference Games

|-
!colspan=9 style="background:#000000; color:#FFFFFF;"| 2015 Sun Belt Conference women's basketball tournament

See also
2014–15 Texas–Arlington Mavericks men's basketball team

References

UT Arlington Mavericks women's basketball seasons
Texas-Arlington
Texas-Arlington Mavericks basketball
Texas-Arlington Mavericks basketball